Global Underground 035: Lima is a DJ mix album in the Global Underground series, compiled and mixed by DJ and producer Nick Warren, who claims that the mix is made up entirely of 'exclusive' tracks purportedly inspired by the Peruvian capital Lima.

Track listing

Disc One
Paul Rogers - Lima Luna (Intro)
Nils Nürnberg - Seduction
Kruse & Nürnberg - An Why E
Jairus Miller - Botnet
Babak Shayan - One in a Million
Ormatie - Twisted Turns
Glide - Cassini
Victoria R - Beauty Goes Blind
Petersky - Kurs Zjazdowy
Panoptic - Surface
Yura Popov - Help
Stan Kolev - Soma Funk (Yvel & Tristan Remix)
Astrid Suryanto - Distant Bar (16 Bit Lolitas Mix)

Disc Two
Alex Dolby - Long Beach
Etiket - Revelation
Chriss of the Quasar; Yvel & Tristan - Panama
Bypass FX - I Am Trying
Richard Gale - Moloko Plus
Somnus Corporation - Expo 86
Thomas Sagstad - Castillian
Martin Brodin - Siberian Transit
The Steals vs. Grafiti - Sinner (Leama & James Davis 'Grafiti' Mix)
Way Out West - Spaceman (Robert Babicz Remix)
Analogue People in a Digital World - Before the Wind
Perc – Bosworth

References 

Global Underground
2008 compilation albums